A pool fire is a type of diffusion flame where a layer of volatile liquid fuel is evaporating and burning. The fuel layer can be either on a horizontal solid substrate or floating on a higher-density liquid, usually water. Pool fires are an important scenario in fire safety science, as large amounts of liquid fuels are stored and transported by different industries.

Physical properties

The most important physical parameter describing a pool fire is the heat release rate, which determines the minimum safe distance needed to avoid burns from thermal radiation. The heat release rate is limited by the rate of evaporation of the fuel, as the combustion reaction takes place in the gas phase. The evaporation rate, in turn, is determined by other physical parameters, such as the depth, surface area and shape of the pool, as well as the fuel boiling point, heat of vaporization, heat of combustion, thermal conductivity and others. A feedback loop exists between the heat release rate and evaporation rate, as a significant part of the energy released in the combustion reaction will be transmitted from the gas phase to the liquid fuel, and can supply the needed heat of vaporization. In the case of large pool fires, most of the heat transfer happens in the form of thermal radiation.

Typical fuels in accidental pool fires, or experiments simulating them, include aliphatic hydrocarbons (n-heptane, liquefied propane gas), aromatic hydrocarbons (toluene, xylene), alcohols (methanol, ethanol) or mixtures thereof (kerosene). It is important that a pool fire with a water-insoluble fuel is not attempted to be extinguished with water, as this can trigger explosive boiling and spattering of the burning material.

See also 

 Radiative transfer
 Fire safety

References 

Fire protection